Hindley Street is located in the north-west quarter of the centre of Adelaide, the capital of South Australia. It runs between King William Street and West Terrace. The street was named after Charles Hindley, a British parliamentarian and social reformist.
 
The street was one of the first built in Adelaide and is of historical significance for a number of reasons.  As well as housing the first meeting of Adelaide City Council, the oldest municipal body in Australia, in November 1840, Hindley Street was home to the first stone church in South Australia; it was also the location of the first movie shown in the colony and the first cinema in the state. The West End Brewery operated in the street between 1859 and 1980.

The street later became known for its atmosphere and active nightlife, including a somewhat seedy reputation, until in the 21st century it reinvented itself as a more upmarket precinct, dubbed the West End.

History

19th century
Hindley Street is as one of Adelaide's most prominent streets, with an extensive and illustrious history. The street itself was named in honour of British politician Charles Hindley. The doings of the population of Adelaide were directly connected to the street, and when the city was first developed after the colonisation of South Australia in 1836, permission was given to cut down trees in favour of constructing buildings and paving streets–the west end of Hindley Street being one of the first locations to receive such development.

The first newspaper in South Australia was printed in premises on Hindley Street, in June 1837.

For many years, the street was the centre of trade and finance for Adelaide, and it was expected to hold that position as time passed. This was because Adelaide was a very young city at the time, with the majority of settlers coming from the west with the water sourced from the River Torrens. Immigrants who landed at Port Adelaide would travel to a ford near Hindmarsh, then to the place where Morphett Street ends and Hindley Street begins. Immigration Square was situated westward of the parklands, with most of Adelaide's business and trade being conducted westwards. The "trade" itself was dubious and the subject of much controversy at the time, with many residents outraged at the young girls who would travel down the street drunk due to alcohol trade.

The first meeting of Adelaide City Council the oldest municipal body in Australia, was held in Hindley Street on 4 November 1840.

The first stone church in South Australia was built in Hindley Street.

On 21 April 1856, the Port Adelaide Railway was officially opened and thus took most of the traffic away from Hindley Street. This shaped Adelaide's changing geography, leading to the formation of what it is today–the suburbs away to the foothills in the east were developed, which meant the trade went east. A reporter on the street in 1913: "The place was a veritable cradle for big concerns. First Ware's Exchange Hotel - a little down from King William Street. It is a history in itself, with its sketches and lingering memories of the pioneering days. To walk through its big low-ceilinged rooms is to think at once of the drovers and farmers who once made merry there. To see the photographs - quaint and laughable - of old George Coppin, the first lessee... when it was built in 1839 is to recall a good comedian of the early years".

On 20 September 1855, an episode of violence erupted on Hindley Street. It was during the Legislative Council election, which saw a mob attempting to interfere with the voting at West Adelaide. Later that same day a much larger riot developed in the same place, after the election was closed. At that time the colony of South Australia was ruled by a governor appointed by the British Government, and the elections were a move towards self-government for the colony.

A new brewery was built on Town Acre 66 on the south side of Hindley Street, midway between Morphett Street and West Terrace, in 1859, known as the West End Brewery. The highly successful brewery was taken over by the South Australian Brewing, Malting, Wine and Spirit Company, an amalgamation of three brewers, in 1888.

In August 1863, Leopold Conrad opened his butcher's shop at 88-90 Hindley Street, on the corner of Victoria Street, where it operated for decades. By 1899, the building had been enlarged, with a second storey and ornamental lacework on the upstairs verandah, which included a coat of arms. Conrad died in December 1918, and the business was taken over by W. H. Bruce, and expanded to Rundle Street, East End Market, and Port Adelaide.

Hindley Street was also home to one of Adelaide's most beloved theatres, the Theatre Royal, designed by Melbourne architect George R. Johnson and opened in 1878 (to replace a previous theatre of the same name built on the site in 1868). On 19 October 1896 the first public moving picture demonstration in South Australia was hosted by Wybert Reeve at the Theatre Royal. (By the following evening the cinématographe Lumière had been moved to a more suitable venue at the Beehive Corner). The building was demolished in 1962 and a carpark built on the site by department store Miller Anderson & Co., an Adelaide department store.

The Grand Coffee Palace was built in 1891. Rebuilt in 1907, it later became the Plaza Hotel. "Coffee palaces" were a type of residential hotel, that provided family-style meals as well as accommodation, but without liquor licences.

20th century

In 1903, the Austral Stores, a complex of 12 shops, large warehouse and residential accommodation, was built to the designs of noted local architect Albert Selmar Conrad at 104-120 Hindley Street. It was listed on the South Australian Heritage Register in 1983 as "an excellent example of Edwardian free style". Its facade is "one of the best examples of the architecture of the Federation period in Adelaide and in South Australia". In 1908 alterations were made, including the addition of a large dining room, and became Grant's Coffee Palace, later West's Coffee Palace.The building remains to this day.

In December 1908, West's Olympia the first permanent picture theatre in Adelaide, was established at 91 Hindley Street, in a building converted from a  roller-skating rink (originally built as a cyclorama, then used as an ice rink known as the Adelaide Glaciarium). The new cinema, built in the era of silent films, had raked seating with a capacity of 3,000 patrons. It was demolished in 1938, with the new West's Theatre opening in 1939, in a new Art Deco design. This cinema operated until 1977, after which various businesses used the premises, until the Adelaide Symphony Orchestra moved in in 2001, creating the Grainger Studio (named after Percy Grainger).

As the 1910s approached, Hindley Street entered a state of despair. The Advertiser, Adelaide's daily newspaper, began reporting on public intoxication in the street as early as 1911. It would later become known for its state of debauchery well into the 21st century.  Theatres, butchers and other business still thrived, despite the shifting of business away from Hindley Street.

By 1912, there were several cinemas in the city, largely clustered around Hindley Street. The new Wondergraph picture theatre was built by the Greater Wondergraph Company from July 1912 at no. 27. Designed by Garlick & Jackman architects, the design of the building was being lauded well before construction, and on the invitation-only event on  the night before its official opening night on Friday 5 September 2013, "every seat was occupied by the audience, which went into raptures over the fine appointments of the theatre and the pictures which were shown". The main feature was  The Crossing Policeman. The theatre was later extensively remodelled as the Civic Theatre in 1932, sold to S.A. Theatres in 1939, who sold it in August to Greater Union, who were leasing the theatre at the time. The theatre demolished to make way for the State Theatre in 1957, which closed in May 1977.
 

The Metro Theatre was one of Adelaide's earliest cinemas, and a noted example of Art Deco architecture, was designed by American theatre architect Thomas W. Lamb in association with local architect F. Kenneth Milne. Built on the site of Conrad's butcher shop on the northeast corner of Victoria Street, it opened on 6 October 1939, a luxurious building which included air-conditioning, and accommodated an audience of 1,286 in stalls, dress circle, and lounge.  It existed on the corner of Hindley and Victoria Street for many years until it was closed in 1972, then subsequently redeveloped in 1975 as a modern four-screen Greater Union cinema complex, called Hindley Cinemas 1–4. It was here that the film Picnic at Hanging Rock (1975) had its world premiere. This cinema would not endure either; it was closed in 1991 and demolished in 2005, with an apartment building built on the site.  a KFC outlet occupies the ground floor, with student accommodation above it.

In the 1970s, 1980s and 1990s, Hindley Street became known for its diversity: coffee lounges, restaurants, pubs, ice and roller skating rinks, late-night chemist, theatres, cinemas, "alternative" bookshops and retail outlets were available along the strip. It was by this time Adelaide's unofficial "nightlife" street, and had also acquired a somewhat seedy reputation.

In 1982, West End Brewery moved to Thebarton and the building was demolished.

In the 1990s, it gained a reputation for being Adelaide's red light district.

21st century
In the early 2000s, the street experienced somewhat of a decline, with several shops closing and left vacant or boarded up, and consequent lack of daytime foot traffic. Late-night alcohol-fuelled violence and drunken behaviour along the street drove the Adelaide City Council to introduce a 3am lockout, in which all business (predominantly nightclubs) must refuse entry after 3am.

Location and description
Hindley Street located in the north-west quarter of the centre of Adelaide. It runs between King William Street and West Terrace.

Two pedestrianised streets which run between Hindley and Currie Streets are notable for their historical value, restaurants, bars, and specialist shops: Leigh Street and Peel Street.

In the 21st century, Hindley Street has been given new life by urban renewal and UniSA's City West campus and a number of businesses, creating the city's West End precinct.

In popular culture
"Hindley Street", a song by Australian band Powderfinger on its album Internationalist, was written about the street.

Hindley Street also features in the song "Carrington Cabaret" by Redgum on their 1978 album If You Don't Fight You Lose.

Architecture

See also

Footnotes

References 

Streets in Adelaide
Red-light districts in Australia